List of school shootings in the United States may refer to:
List of school shootings in the United States (before 2000)
List of school shootings in the United States (2000–present)

See also
List of school shootings in the United States by death toll